Mountain station may refer to:

Mountain Station, a commuter rail station in New Jersey, United States
Mountain Avenue station, a commuter rail station in New Jersey, United States
Top station, the highest station of a funicular, an aerial or T-bar lift, or a rack railway